Out of the Fog is a lost 1919 silent film drama directed by Albert Capellani and starring Alla Nazimova billed as Madame Nazimova.
It was produced by Nazimova, Richard A. Rowland and Maxwell Karger with distribution through Metro Pictures.

Cast
Alla Nazimova - Faith & Eve
Charles Bryant -  Philip Blake
Henry Harmon - Job Coffin
Nancy Palmer - Maude Standish
T. Morse Koupal - Luke Allen
George Davis - Brad Standish
Charles Smiley - Elijah Allen
Tom Blake - Jim Smooth
Hugh Jeffrey - Constable
Dorothy Smoller - Dancer
Marie Grant - Fisher Folk
Ada Scovill - Fisher Folk
J. O'Connor - Fisher Folk
Amelia Burleson - Fisher Folk
Harry Wise - Fisher Folk

References

External links

1919 films
American silent feature films
Lost American films
Metro Pictures films
Films directed by Albert Capellani
American black-and-white films
1919 drama films
Silent American drama films
1919 lost films
Lost drama films
1910s American films